Aliabad (formerly Pichh Bhannah) is a beautiful village in the Bakot union council of the Abbottabad District in Khyber Pakhtunkhwa, Pakistan.

It is 108.5 km from Islamabad. It lies on a side of Miranjani Peak.

Etymology
The name Aliabad is derived from two words: Ali (The name of Muslim saint Baba Ali Muhammad, the founder of Pichh Bhannah) and Abad (brought up).

Description
The majority of residents, some 80%, are Gujar Chauhans. There are also Syeds,Janjuah's andAwans(Pakistan),  in the village. Bariyan (Centre), Kalaban, Kotli, Sehragran, Danna (Rehman Abad), Kohoey, Baribagla and Balikot/Riyala are the main mohallas (neighborhoods) of Aliabad.

Founding father
The late Ch. Abdul Rehman was a great leader of present-day Aliabad. He ruled over the political scenario of the district of Abbottabad.Ch. Abdul Rehman's friends  Late  Ch.Mir Ahmad, Sufi Muhammad Suleman,LateSyed Abid Hussain Shah,lateCh.Sarfaraz Satti,LateCh.Yousaf,lateCh.Badal Zaman, Late Ch.Sharif,Late Ch Faiz Ullah,LateIsmail Janjua,late Roshan din Awan,Asharaf Awanand Ch Qalandar Khan played an important rule to beautifying and unifying this village.  Because of their visionary and missionary leadership, a backward area (Pichh Bhannah) turned into the literate, skilled, and civilized town of Aliabad. Their contributions towards social development programs like road development, water, electricity, and Educational programs helped develop the town.
Ch.Zaheer Yousaf is now serving as a Chairman of Aliabad.

See also
Bakot

References

Populated places in Abbottabad District